The 49th Infantry Brigade, later known as 49th (Eastern) Infantry Brigade during the Cold War, was a brigade of the British Army.

First World War
The brigade started its existence as part of the 16th (Irish) Division, part of Kitchener's Army in the First World War. The 16th Division served through the war on the Western Front.

Cold War 
The 49th Brigade also served in Kenya during the Mau Mau Uprising from 1953 to 1955-6, incorporating the 1st Battalion, Royal Northumbrian Fusiliers, and the 1st Battalion, Royal Innskilling Fusiliers, joined by the 1st Battalion, Royal Irish Fusiliers, from January 1955.

However the core of the brigade's present history descends from the 49th (West Riding) Division, which fought in both World Wars. In the Second World War, the division was involved in the Norwegian Campaign, the guarding of Iceland, and Operation Overlord, where it landed in Normandy under XXX Corps. It was part of the reformed Territorial Army (as an armoured formation for a time) from 1947 to 1967.

The Brigade Headquarters was reformed as a regular HQ with TA units in 1982 as part of 2nd Infantry Division. It consisted of 5th and 7th Battalions, Royal Anglian Regiment, 5th Battalion, Royal Regiment of Fusiliers, 3rd Battalion, The Staffordshire Regiment, the Royal Yeomanry, equipped with Fox armoured cars, 100th (Yeomanry) Regiment Royal Artillery, with 105mm Light Guns, and 307 OP Battery RA (V). The Division was tasked with the wartime rear-area security of the I (BR) Corps sector, behind the forward armoured divisions, during any Soviet thrust into Western Europe.

1990s to disbandment 
Following the end of the Cold War, the Brigade was reorganised as 49 (East Midlands) Brigade on 1 April 1992, and then as 49 (East) Brigade on 1 April 1995 following the merger with 54 (East Anglia) Brigade.

The brigade now has regional responsibility for Norfolk, Suffolk, Cambridgeshire, Northamptonshire, Leicester, Nottinghamshire, Lincolnshire, Derbyshire, Essex, Bedfordshire, Hertfordshire and Rutland. In April 2000 the Brigade came under command of the 4th Division based in Aldershot. As from 1 April 2007, the Brigade came under the command of the 5th Division based in Shrewsbury and as of 2012 the Brigade came under the command of Support Command.

Under Army 2020, 49 (East) Brigade was merged with 7th Armoured Brigade to become 7th Infantry Brigade and Headquarters East on 13 February 2015.

Structure in 1989 
Below is the structure of the brigade in 1989, just before the end of the Cold War.

 Headquarters 49th (Eastern) Infantry Brigade
 Headquarters 49th Infantry Brigade and Signal Troop, Royal Corps of Signals (V), Chilwell
 49th Infantry Brigade Defence and Employment Section, Royal Pioneer Corps (V)
 The Royal Yeomanry (V), in Chelsea, London
 5th (Volunteer) Battalion, Royal Regiment of Fusiliers (V), in Coventry
 Warwickshire Band of the Royal Regiment of Fusiliers
 5th (Volunteer) Battalion, Royal Anglian Regiment (V), in Peterborough
 7th (Volunteer) Battalion, Royal Anglian Regiment (V), in Leicester
 5th (Shropshire and Herefordshire) Battalion, The Light Infantry (V), in Shrewsbury
 3rd (Volunteer) Battalion, Staffordshire Regiment (Prince of Wales's) (V), in Wolverhampton
 100th (Yeomanry) Field Regiment, Royal Artillery (V) (Field Artillery), in Grove Park, London

References

External links
 
 David C Isby and Charles Kamps Jr, Armies of NATO's Central Front, Jane's Publishing Company, 1985
 Gregory Blaxland, The Regiments Depart: A History of the British Army 1945-70, William Kimber, London, 1971.

49